The Nanceene was a French automobile manufactured from 1900 until around 1903.  The company built cars and trucks similar to the Gobron-Brillié.

References
David Burgess Wise, The New Illustrated Encyclopedia of Automobiles.

Defunct motor vehicle manufacturers of France